Jan Clausen is an American writer. She has co-edited Conditions, a journal of women's writing, with Elly Bulkin.

Works
 After Touch, 1975
 Waking at the Bottom of the Dark, 1979. Poetry.
 Mother, Sister, Daughter, Lover, 1980
 Duration, 1983. Collection of stories.
 Illustrated by None: The Prosperine Papers, 1988
 Books and Life, 1989
 Beyond Gay or Straight: Understanding Sexual Orientation, 1996
 Apples and Oranges: My Journey through Sexual Identity, 1999

References

American writers
Year of birth missing (living people)
Living people